Phil Ramuno is an American television director. During the early years of his career he worked as a stage manager on the sitcoms Fish, Benson and Soap. His credits as a director includes Too Close for Comfort, Gimme a Break!, Amen, 9 to 5, Throb, Charles in Charge, Sister Kate and Grace Under Fire.

In 2006, he along with fellow television director Mary Lou Belli wrote the book The Sitcom Career Book with foreword by actor Henry Winkler.

References

External links

American television directors
Living people
Place of birth missing (living people)
Year of birth missing (living people)
American male writers
Stage managers